"I Call Your Name" is a song by Norwegian band A-ha, released on 3 December 1990 as the second single from their fourth studio album, East of the Sun, West of the Moon (1990). It was written by Paul Waaktaar-Savoy and Magne Furuholmen.

Music video
The accompanying music video for "I Call Your Name" was directed by Michael Burlingame and Lauren Savoy. It received heavy rotation on MTV Europe. Two versions of the video were produced, one in gray-scale and one in color.

Critical reception
Davydd Chong of Record Mirror described the song as "comfortable, inoffensive pop".

Track listings
 7-inch single: Warner Bros. / W 9462 United Kingdom
 "I Call Your Name" – 4:54
 "The Way We Talk" – 1:30

 12-inch single: Warner Bros. / W 9462T United Kingdom
 "I Call Your Name" – 4:54
 "The Way We Talk" – 1:30
 "The Blood That Moves The Body" – 4:05

 7-inch single: Warner Bros. / W 9462EP United Kingdom
 "I Call Your Name" – 4:54
 "The Sun Always Shines on T.V." – 5:08
 "Hunting High And Low" – 3:44
 "The Blood That Moves The Body" – 4:05
Note: This 7-inch vinyl release is a "Limited Edition E.P."

 CD single: Warner Bros. / W 9462CD United Kingdom
 "I Call Your Name" – 4:54
 "The Way We Talk" – 1:30
 The Blood That Moves The Body" – 4:05

Charts

References

1990 singles
1990 songs
A-ha songs
Song recordings produced by Alan Tarney
Songs written by Magne Furuholmen
Songs written by Paul Waaktaar-Savoy
Warner Records singles